Q7 may refer to:

Media
 Q... (TV series) by Spike Milligan on the BBC; "Q7" refers to the third series

Technology
 AN/FSQ-7, the IBM vacuum tube computer for the SAGE air-defense system, where "Q7" was the commonly used nickname
 Qseven, a formfactor for industrial PC-boards

Transportation
 Audi Q7, a German full-size SUV
 Changhe Q7, a Chinese mid-size SUV
 French submarine Farfadet (Q7)
 LNER Class Q7, a class of British 0-8-0 steam locomotives 
 Q7 (New York City bus)

Other
 Q7 Wind Farm, an offshore wind farm in the Netherlands, now renamed to Princess Amalia Wind Farm
Quran 7, the 7th chapter of the Islamic Holy book

See also
7Q (disambiguation)